Mike Tyson vs. Donovan Ruddock, billed as The Fight of the Year, was a professional boxing match contested on March 18, 1991 at the Mirage in Paradise, Nevada, USA. At the time the two fighters were the top two ranked contenders for the WBC, WBA, and IBF world heavyweight championships that were at the time held by Evander Holyfield. The bout was a twelve-round championship eliminator fight, with the winner becoming the mandatory challenger to Holyfield's crown.

Tyson, the former champion, defeated Ruddock by technical knockout in the seventh round but the circumstances surrounding the stoppage nearly caused a riot and a rematch was signed to settle the dispute.

Background
Tyson and Ruddock had originally been set to face each other on November 18, 1989, in Edmonton, Alberta, in Ruddock's adopted home country of Canada for Tyson's undisputed world championship. However, the fight was postponed and ultimately cancelled because Tyson was suffering from costochondritis. Tyson instead would fight James "Buster" Douglas on February 11, 1990 in Tokyo, where he would be knocked out in a massive upset and lose his belts.

Tyson would fight twice more in 1990 and won both bouts by first-round knockout. He defeated 1984 Olympic gold medalist Henry Tillman on June 16 and then beat undefeated up-and-coming prospect Alex Stewart on December 8.

Ruddock, meanwhile, had won twenty-five of his first twenty-seven fights, with his only defeat coming at the hands of journeyman David Jaco early in his career. He had also defeated former world champions Mike Weaver, James "Bonecrusher" Smith, and Michael Dokes along the way.

On December 9, 1990, the day after Tyson defeated Stewart, Tyson promoter Don King announced Ruddock would indeed be Tyson's next opponent while also announcing that Tyson and Showtime had agreed to a blockbuster long term  pay-per-view deal that would pay Tyson $120 million.

The fight
The fight was a hard-fought one, with both men hitting each other with power punches throughout the fight. Early in the second round, Tyson scored a controversial knockdown. After being hit with a left hook to the shoulder, Ruddock tripped over Tyson's right leg and fell to the canvas. Referee Richard Steele awarded Tyson with the knockdown. Shortly after, Tyson would illegally hit Ruddock with a right hand as the two men were being separated by Steele, though Steele did not deduct a point from Tyson.  Ruddock would suffer another knockdown late in round 3. After hitting Tyson with a straight left hand with less than 10 seconds to go in the round, Tyson countered with a powerful left hook to the side of Ruddock's head that again sent Ruddock to the canvas.  Ruddock was able to get up at the count of 8 as the round ended.  The fight would come to an end with less than a minute remaining in round 7.  Tyson was able to hit Ruddock with a six-punch combination.  Though Ruddock remained on his feet and was seemingly healthy enough to continue the fight, Steele stepped between the two fighters and stopped the fight, awarding Tyson the victory by technical knockout.

The decision enraged Ruddock's corner with Ruddock's brother and manager, Delroy storming the ring to confront Steele. Tyson's trainer Richie Giachetti attempted to restrain Delroy but a melee ensued that also involved Ruddock's promoter Murad Muhammad. Mirage security had to break up the scuffle and escort Steele to safety.

Undercard

There were two world championship bouts on the undercard of the event. 

In the first, Julio Cesar Chavez defended his WBC and IBF super lightweight championships against John Duplessis, knocking him out in the fourth round to extend his undefeated streak to seventy-three bouts. 

The second was a title unification bout between IBF welterweight champion Maurice Blocker and WBC welterweight champion Simon Brown. Brown won by TKO in the tenth round to take Blocker’s title despite Blocker being ahead on all of the judges’ scorecards at the time of the stoppage. 

Future multi-time middleweight and light heavyweight champion Bernard Hopkins was also featured on the undercard, as was former world heavyweight champion Greg Page and multi-class world champion Roberto Duran. Hopkins and Page won their fights by knockout, while Duran was injured in his bout with Pat Lawlor and could not continue.

References

1991 in boxing
Boxing in Las Vegas
Boxing on Showtime
1991 in sports in Nevada
Ruddock
March 1991 sports events in the United States